Louise Dahl-Wolfe: Painting with Light is a 1999 documentary film about Louise Dahl-Wolfe, an important woman in the history of photography.  It was written and directed by Tom Neff, and produced by Neff and Madeline Bell, who previously collaborated on the Oscar nominated short-documentary Red Grooms: Sunflower in a Hothouse (1986).

Synopsis
This short documentary film on the life of Louise Dahl-Wolfe draws upon her art and her personality. The documentary reviews how Dahl-Wolfe "discovered" Lauren Bacall, who at the time was a young actress (seventeen years-of-age) and worked as a model.  It was Dahl-Wolfe's photos of Bacall that film producer Harry Warner saw, and subsequently asked Bacall that she come to Hollywood for a screen test. As a result, Bacall was cast opposite Humphrey Bogart in the film To Have and Have Not (1944).

Dahl-Wolfe also photographed: Tallulah Bankhead, Spencer Tracy, Eudora Welty, Paul Robeson, Bette Davis, and others.

Background
The documentary took over ten years to complete and features the only surviving modern footage of Dahl-Wolfe, including extensive interviews.

Interviews
 Louise Dahl-Wolfe
 Lauren Bacall
 Babs Simpson

Distribution
The film has been shown on selected PBS television stations and was the first original production of the new digital channel: DOC: The Documentary Channel and was screened at the Bel Air Film Festival.

References

External links
 Tom Neff official web site (see Films for film clip)
 

1999 films
1999 documentary films
American documentary films
Documentary films about photographers
Films directed by Tom Neff
American independent films
Documentary films about women
1999 independent films
1990s English-language films
1990s American films